Tout Feu Tout Flamme... C'est Pour De Rire is a studio album by the French progressive rock band Ange. It was released in 1987.

Track listing
Side One:
"Tout Feu, Tout Flamme [Version 87]"  – 04:35
"Tout Contre Tout"  – 05:24
"Coquille D'œuf"  – 03:35
"C'est Pour De Rire"  – 07:22
Side Two:
"Sur Les Grands Espaces Bleus"  – 06:46
"3 X 1 = Nous"  – 03:37
"J'suis Pas D'ici"  – 02:17
"Il Est Le Soleil"  – 07:40

Personnel
 Lead Vocals: Christian Decamps
 Keyboards, Backing Vocals: Francis Decamps
 Guitar except on "Tout Feu, Tout Flamme": Serge Cuenot
 Bass except on "Tout Feu, Tout Flamme": Laurent Sigrist
 Drums, Percussion, Backing Vocals: Francis Meyer

Additional Musicians
 Guitar on "Tout Feu, Tout Flamme": Jean-Michel Brezovar
 Bass on "Tout Feu, Tout Flamme": Daniel Haas
 Backing Vocals: Martine Kesselburg
 Backing Vocals: Eva Santi

References
Tout Feu Tout Flamme... C'est Pour De Rire on ange-updlm 
Tout Feu Tout Flamme... C'est Pour De Rire on www.discogs.com

Ange albums
1987 albums